The 1904 Kansas gubernatorial election was held on November 8, 1904. Republican nominee Edward W. Hoch defeated Democratic nominee David M. Dale with 57.92% of the vote.

General election

Candidates
Major party candidates 
Edward W. Hoch, Republican
David M. Dale, Democratic

Other candidates
Granville Lowther, Socialist
James Kerr, Prohibition

Results

References

1904
Kansas
Gubernatorial